Erwin Friedrich Richard Biegel (25 March 1896 – 24 May 1954) was a German stage and film actor who appeared in over eighty feature films in a variety of supporting roles.

Selected filmography

 The Young Count (1935)
 His Late Excellency (1935)
 Dinner Is Served (1936)
 The Mysterious Mister X (1936)
 The Accusing Song (1936)
 Truxa (1937)
 The Ways of Love Are Strange (1937)
 Fremdenheim Filoda (1937)
 Gasparone (1937)
 Seven Slaps (1937)
 Fanny Elssler (1937)
 Revolutionshochzeit (1938)
 The Stars Shine (1938)
 Anna Favetti (1938)
 The Man Who Couldn't Say No (1938)
 Zwei Frauen (1938)
 The Green Emperor (1939)
 Woman Without a Past (1939)
 Robert and Bertram (1939)
 The Rothschilds (1940)
 Wunschkonzert (1940)
 The Girl at the Reception (1940)
 Melody of a Great City (1943)
The Master of the Estate (1943)
 I Entrust My Wife to You (1943)
 Nora (1944)
 Young Hearts (1944)
 The Years Pass (1945)
 Tell the Truth (1946)
 Raid (1947)
 King of Hearts (1947)
 The Court Concert (1948)
 Don't Dream, Annette (1949)
 The Orplid Mystery (1950)
 Torreani (1951)
 Dark Eyes (1951)
 When the Heath Dreams at Night (1952)
 Fritz and Friederike (1952)  
 When The Village Music Plays on Sunday Nights (1953)
 The Dancing Heart (1953)
 Such a Charade (1953)
 Josef the Chaste (1953)

Bibliography
 O'Brien, Mary-Elizabeth. Nazi Cinema as Enchantment: The Politics of Entertainment in the Third Reich. Camden House, 2006.

External links

1896 births
1954 deaths
German male film actors
German male stage actors
Male actors from Berlin
20th-century German male actors